Preload may refer to:

Science and technology
 Preload (cardiology), maximum stretch of the heart at the end of diastole
 preload (software), code-prefetching software for Linux
 Preload (engineering), the internal application of stress to certain mechanical systems

Other uses
 Pre-loading, drinking alcohol at home before going to public places to drink

See also
 Load (disambiguation)